The 1941 Copa Adrián C. Escober Final was the final that decided the winner of the 2nd. edition of Copa Adrián C. Escobar, an Argentine domestic cup organised by the Argentine Football Association. The match was contested by River Plate and Huracán, both being finalists for the first time.

The final was held in River Plate Stadium on November 2, 1941. With an attendance of 66,000, River Plate beat Huracán 1–0 winning their first Copa Escobar trophy.

Qualified teams

Overview 
This edition was contested by the seven best placed teams of the 1942 Primera División season. River Plate, as champion, advanced directly to semifinals. The matches only lasted 40 minutes (two halves of 20' each), with some teams playing two games in a day. All the matches were held in River Plate Stadium.

In the tournament, Huracán beat Independiente 1–0 in quarterfinals, and Newell's Old Boys 2–1 in semifinals. River Plate beat San Lorenzo de Almagro in semifinals 2–1 to advance to the final, which they subsequently won.

Match details

References

e
e
1941 in Argentine football
Football in Buenos Aires